Dennis Allen Cutts (born April 11, 1968) is an American basketball coach, currently an assistant for the Austin Spurs of the NBA G League. He is the former men's basketball head coach for University of California, Riverside.

Cutts was announced as a part of the Wisconsin Herd coaching staff on September 24, 2019.

Head coaching record

References

1968 births
Living people
Albany Great Danes men's basketball players
American men's basketball coaches
Basketball coaches from New York (state)
College men's basketball head coaches in the United States
Junior college men's basketball coaches in the United States
Northern Arizona Lumberjacks men's basketball coaches
San Jose State Spartans men's basketball coaches
Stephen F. Austin Lumberjacks basketball coaches
UC Riverside Highlanders men's basketball coaches
Wisconsin Herd coaches